Tirupattur district, or Tirupathur district, is one of the 38 districts in the southern Indian state of Tamil Nadu. The district was formed in 2019 by the division of Vellore district into three smaller districts. Its creation alongside Ranipet district was announced on 15 August 2019, and it was officially declared on 28 November 2019. The town of Tirupattur serves as the district headquarters.

Geography 
The district is bordered by Vellore district to the northeast, Krishnagiri district to the southwest, Tiruvannamalai district to the southeast, and the Chittoor district of Andhra Pradesh to the northwest. National Highway 48 passes through the district.

Divisions
Tirupattur district was created by the splitting off of the three southwestern taluks of Vellore district: Tirupattur, Vaniyambadi, and Ambur. The district now includes Natrampalli for a total of four taluks.

Politics
Tiruppattur, Vellore Assembly constituency is the assembly constituency. Since 2016 Tiruppattur, Vellore Assembly constituency is represented in the Tamil Nadu Legislative Assembly by A Nallathambi of DMK party. He was reelected in 2021.
 

|}

References 

Districts of Tamil Nadu